Whitefish Bay 34A is a First Nations reserve on Lake of the Woods near Sioux Narrows-Nestor Falls in northwestern Ontario. It is one of the reserves of the Animakee Wa Zhing 37 First Nation.

References

Anishinaabe reserves in Ontario
Communities in Kenora District